Mathias Clemens (Redange, August 8, 1915 — Huncherange, November 26, 2001) was a Luxembourgish professional road bicycle racer. Mathias Clemens was the brother of cyclist Pierre Clemens.

Major results

1935
Tour de Luxembourg
Overall classification
1936
Grunwald
Luxembourg
Tour de France:
Winner stage 3
7th place overall classification
Tour de Luxembourg:
Overall classification
Winner stage 8
1937
Tour de Luxembourg:
Overall classification
Winner stage 1
1938
Hollerich
Luxembourg
 national road race championships
Tour de Luxembourg:
Winner stage 3
Tour de France:
5th place overall classification
1939
Tour de Luxembourg:
Overall classification
Winner stages 3 and 4
Tour de France:
4th place overall classification
1940
 national cyclo-cross championships
1941
 GP Schweinfurt (GER)
Luxembourg
Rundfahrt Westmark (inc. stage 2)
1942
Esch-sur-Alzette
Huncherange
1943
Pétange
Wiltz
1944
Esch-sur-Alzette
Wiltz
1947
Alger
Tour de Luxembourg:
Overall classification
Winner stage 3
 national road race championships

External links 

1915 births
2001 deaths
People from Redange
Luxembourgian male cyclists
Luxembourgian Tour de France stage winners